Daniel Liw (born 24 January 1979) is a Swedish bandy player who used to play for Edsbyn as a midfielder.

Career

Club career
Liw is a youth product of Edsbyn and has represented their Västerås, Hammarby, Edsbyn, and Dynamo Moscow.

International career
Liw was part of Swedish World Champions team of 2005.

Honours

Country
 Sweden
 Bandy World Championship: 2005

References

External links
 

1979 births
Living people
Swedish bandy players
Västerås SK Bandy players
Hammarby IF Bandy players
Edsbyns IF players
Dynamo Moscow players
Swedish expatriate sportspeople in Russia
Expatriate bandy players in Russia
Elitserien (bandy) players
Sweden international bandy players
Bandy World Championship-winning players